Roden is a name of Germanic origin, originally meaning "red valley" or an anglicization of the Gaelic name "O'Rodain".  It may refer to:

Places
Roden, Bavaria, a town in the Main-Spessart district of Bavaria, Germany
Roden, Netherlands, a town in the province of Drenthe, Netherlands
Rodén, a village in Fuentes de Ebro municipality of the Province of Zaragoza, Spain
Roden Crater, a volcanic cone in Arizona
Roden, Shropshire, a village in England
Roden, the German name for Zagăr Commune, Mureș County, Romania
Roden, Sweden, the name of the coastal folkland corresponding to today's Roslagen in Sweden, divided into a northern part, Tiundalands roden, and a southern part, Attundalands roden
The River Roden, Berkshire, a tributary of the River Pang in England
The River Roden, Shropshire, a tributary of the River Tern in England

People
 Claudia Roden (born 1936), British cookbook writer and cultural anthropologist
 Dan Roden (born 1950), American medical researcher
 Earl of Roden, a title in the Peerage of Ireland
 Benjamin Roden (1902–1978), American religious leader
 Karel Roden (born 1962), Czech actor
 Roden Brothers, silversmiths
 Helen Roden (born 1986), former college basketballer and Australian rules footballer
 Holland Roden (born 1986), actress
 Roden Cutler (1916–2002), Australian diplomat
 Roden Noel (1834–1894), English poet
James Roden 1981 until present , RAF Pilot

See also
 Rodden (disambiguation)
 Rodin (surname)